Jeremy J. Smith is a British philologist who is Professor of English Philology at the University of Glasgow.

Biography
Jeremy J. Smith has served as Professor of English Philology at the University of Glasgow since 2000. He is also a Visiting Professor at the University of Stavanger. Smith specialises in English historical linguistics, in the history of Scots, and in the textual cultures of Britain and Ireland. He has published a number of books and articles, and teaches a range of courses, in these areas, in which he is internationally renowned.

Smith is a founding member of the Medieval Manuscripts Research Consortium, a member of the Board of Trustees of Scottish Language Dictionaries Ltd and the Council of the Scottish Text Society, a Fellow of the English Association, a Fellow of the Royal Society of Edinburgh, and an Honorary Fellow of the Association for Scottish Literary Studies. He is currently President of the International Society for the Linguistics of English.

Selected bibliography
 Scots and English in the letters of John Knox, 2010
 Older Scots: A Linguistic Reader, 2012

Notes and references

Notes

References
 

Academics of the University of Glasgow
Anglo-Saxon studies scholars
British philologists
Fellows of the English Association
Fellows of the Royal Society of Edinburgh
Academic staff of the University of Stavanger
Year of birth missing (living people)
Living people